Absalom Jordan (1840 - May 3, 1888) was an American soldier who fought in the American Civil War. Jordan received his country's highest award for bravery during combat, the Medal of Honor. Jordan's medal was won for his capturing a flag at the Battle of Sailor's Creek, Virginia on April 6, 1865 He was honored with the award on May 3, 1865.

Jordan was born in Brown County, Ohio, entered service in Madison, Indiana, and was buried in Lovett, Indiana.

Medal of Honor citation

See also
List of American Civil War Medal of Honor recipients: G–L

References

1840 births
1888 deaths
Date of birth unknown
American Civil War recipients of the Medal of Honor
Burials in Indiana
People from Brown County, Ohio
People of Ohio in the American Civil War
Union Army officers
United States Army Medal of Honor recipients